Mandelli's mouse-eared bat (Myotis sicarius) is a species of vesper bat. It can be found in India and Nepal. It is found in subtropical or tropical moist montane forests. It is threatened by habitat loss. The name honours the ornithologist Louis Mandelli.

References

Mouse-eared bats
Mammals of Nepal
Taxonomy articles created by Polbot
Mammals described in 1915
Taxa named by Oldfield Thomas
Bats of Asia